Amit Dutt (born 6 September 1973) is an Indian scientist, geneticist and the principal investigator at Advanced Centre for Treatment, Research and Education in Cancer (ACTREC) of Tata Memorial Centre. Known for his studies on Fibroblast growth factor receptor, Dutt is a Wellcome Trust / DBT India Alliance Intermediate Fellow. The Council of Scientific and Industrial Research, the apex agency of the Government of India for scientific research, awarded him the Shanti Swarup Bhatnagar Prize for Science and Technology, one of the highest Indian science awards, for his contributions to medical sciences in 2017.

Biography 

Amit Dutt, born on 6 September 1973 in Patna, capital of the Indian state of Bihar, earned a BSc in botany from Desbandhu College, Delhi University in 1994 and continued there to complete a post-graduate diploma in Biochemical Technology in 1995 from the Sri Venkateswara College. Moving to Jamia Millia Islamia, he obtained his MSc in 1997 and enrolled for doctoral studies at the Delhi center of the International Centre for Genetic Engineering and Biotechnology to secure a PhD in plant genetics in 2000, guided by Vanga Siva Reddy of Delhi University and Arif Ali of Jamia Millia Islamia. Subsequently, he traveled to the University of Zurich and working under the guidance of Alex Hajnal at the Institute of Molecular Life Sciences of the university, secured another PhD in Developmental Biology in 2004.

Dutt continued in Zurich to work  at the Institute of Neuropathology of the university and in 2005, he moved to join the laboratory of Matthew Meyerson at the Broad Institute of Harvard and MIT as a research associate and worked there till 2010, stationing at Dana–Farber Cancer Institute, a Harvard Medical School affiliate. On his return to India in Oct 2010, he joined Tata Memorial Centre, at the Advanced Centre for Treatment, Research and Education in Cancer (ACTREC), Navi Mumbai where he is the principal investigator at scientist (grade F) and heads the Integrated Cancer Genomics Lab, popularly known as Dutt Lab.

Legacy and honors 

Dutt is known to have made notable contributions in the field of cancer genetics, widening our understanding of the disease and its translational possibilities. The group led by him have been engaged in the study of the progression of cancer in the lung, breast, cervical, gallbladder, head and neck and his research may be classified under three heads; cancer genomics, functional genomics and pathogen discovery. It is reported that the research collaboration Dutt had with Kumar Prabhash of Tata Memorial Centre led to the Epidermal Growth Factor Receptor (EGFR) and KRAS mutation profiling of Indian lung cancer patients for the first time. The research association between the duo has also led to the development of HPVDetector and TMC-SNPdb (both computational tools) and CRE, an experimental tool. Discovery of MMP10 protein, a biomarker which assists the doctors in deciding the surgical protocol in tongue cancer patients is another contribution of Dutt, which was the result of collaborative research with Sudhir Nair of TMC. They also identified a genome signature which associated tobacco chewing with oral cancer. His studies have been documented by way of a number of articles and ResearchGate, an online article repository of scientific articles, has listed 118 of them.

Dutt is a member of faculty of F1000 Prime and holds memberships in associations such as American Association for Cancer Research, the Indian chapter of Lung Cancer Consortium of Asia, Society of Biological Chemists (India), and Indian Association for Cancer Research. He has also sat in the editorial boards of BMC Genomics and PLoS One journals.

Awards and honors 
Apart from a number of student fellowships, Dutt has held research fellowships, starting with the Julius Klaus Foundation Fellowship in 2004, followed by Swiss National Science Foundation Postdoctoral fellowship of the Government of Switzerland in 2005. The Department of Biotechnology awarded him the Ramalingaswamy Fellowship in 2010 and he became a Wellcome Trust / DBT India Alliance Intermediate Fellow in 2011. The Council of Scientific and Industrial Research awarded Dutt the Shanti Swarup Bhatnagar Prize, one of the highest Indian science awards in 2017.

Selected bibliography 
 
 
  
 
 
 
 
 }

See also 

 Carcinogenesis
 Matrix metalloproteinase

Notes

References

Further reading

External links 
 

Recipients of the Shanti Swarup Bhatnagar Award in Medical Science
Indian medical academics
Indian scientific authors
1973 births
Living people
Scientists from Bihar
Delhi University alumni
Jamia Millia Islamia alumni
University of Zurich alumni
Academic staff of the University of Zurich
Indian geneticists